The fixture between Leicester City and Derby County is a football rivalry in the East Midlands.  The fixture is often called an East Midlands derby.  Although both clubs have a strong mutual dislike of each other, they both consider Nottingham Forest their main rivals.

Overall record
 Derby County: 46 wins
 28 draws
 Leicester City 34 wins

Historically, Derby have a better record against Leicester beating them 46 times in 108 meetings.  Leicester have won 34 meetings with 28 ending in draws.  However, in recent years Leicester have dominated the fixture, having won 8 of the last 9 meetings.  In fact, a Derby player didn't score against Leicester from 2007 until Theo Robinson scored against them in the Championship game on 1 December 2012.

Crossing the divide

During both Derby and Leicester's history several players have played for both clubs and a manager has managed both.

Players
Derby then Leicester
 Johnny McMillan
 Jack Bowers
 Tommy Eggleston
 David McCulloch
 Johnny Morris
 Willie Carlin
 Gerry Daly
 Dave Langan
 Gary Mills, also played for Nottingham Forest and Notts County
 Bobby Davison
 Ian Ormondroyd
 Phil Gee
 Gary Rowett
 Dean Sturridge
 Jacob Laursen
 Lee Morris
 Steve Howard
 Matt Oakley
 Chris Powell
 Marc Edworthy
 James Vaughan

Leicester then Derby
 Mick O'Brien
 John Summers
 David Nish
 David Webb
 Trevor Christie, also played for Nottingham Forest and Notts County.
 Mark Wallington
 Mark Grew
 Peter Shilton, also played for Nottingham Forest.
 Ian Wilson
 Paul Kitson
 Gary Charles also played for Nottingham Forest.
 Russell Hoult
 Ashley Ward
 Spencer Prior
 Chris Makin
 Kevin Poole
 Ryan Smith
 Robbie Savage – played for Birmingham City and Blackburn Rovers in between.
 Paul Dickov – loaned to Derby County from Leicester in 2009.
 Jordan Stewart
 Lee Hendrie
 DJ Campbell
 David Martin
 Zak Whitbread
 Michael Keane – loaned to Leicester City, and later Derby County, from Manchester United
 Jesse Lingard – loaned to Leicester City, and later Derby County, from Manchester United
 David Nugent
 Martyn Waghorn – played for Rangers, Wigan Athletic and Ipswich Town in between.
 Tom Lawrence
 Andy King – loaned to Derby County from Leicester in January 2019.
 Richard Stearman

Managers and staff
 Nigel Pearson – managed Leicester in 2 separate spells, left Derby by mutual consent on 8 October 2016
 Kevin Phillips – Player and coach at Leicester, later first team coach at Derby

Results since 2006

Notable results

Honours

Hooliganism 
Games between the two teams, like the majority of local derbies in English football, have resulted in a number of football hooliganism incidents.

After a EFL Cup game between the two sides in 1985 which saw Leicester eliminated at the hands of Derby, there was a widespread "riot".

In October 2009, James Underwood, a Derby supporter aligned with the firm Derby Lunatic Fringe was involved in an incident with Leicester supporters. In May 2010, Underwood was then banned from attending football matches for three years for his role in that incident, among other separate clashes involving supporters of Everton, Nottingham Forest and Sheffield Wednesday.

Trivia
 The Highest scoring game between the two sides ended 5–2 to Derby County in the 1928/29 English football season. The year Leicester achieved what was until their Premier League title win in 2015–16 their highest ever league finish, 2nd in Division One (now the Premier League)
 Leicester have a 100% record on neutral ground beating Derby 2–1 in the 1993/94 Play-off finals for promotion to the Premier League.
 The last time Derby beat Leicester away from home was 3–0 in 2002. The year both clubs were relegated from the Premier League. Leicester won the reverse fixture 3–2.
 According to the Football fan census, Leicester and Derby are 'traditional' rivals.
 Leicester as well as Forest refer to Derby as 'the sheep', a reference to their nickname being the Rams.
 Of the two clubs, Leicester have a better record against Nottingham Forest.

See also 

 Leicester City F.C.–Nottingham Forest F.C. rivalry
 M69 derby

References

England football derbies
Leicester City
Derby County
Sport in Derby
Sport in Leicester